Prem Nath Malhotra, better known as Prem Nath, was an Indian actor and director, who was best known for his works in Hindi films. Nath made his debut with the film Ajit (1948), and went on to appear in over 100 films throughout his career. He was nominated for three Filmfare Awards, and later retired in 1985.

Personal life
He was born in 1926 in the Karimpura locality near Ghanta Ghar in Peshawar. His family moved to Jubbulpore (present-day Jabalpur) after partition and he moved to Bombay where he was discovered as an actor.

He fell in love with actress Bina Rai during the filming of Aurat. They married and formed a production company together called P.N. films. Their children are actor Prem Krishen and Kailash Nath (Monty). Premnath also dated the famous actress Madhubala but stopped when she became interested in actor Dilip Kumar.

They are also the grandparents of actress Akanksha Malhotra and director Siddharth Malhotra who are Prem Krishen's children. Adiraj Malhotra and Arjun Malhotra are the sons of Kailash Nath. His sister Krishna married Raj Kapoor while his other sister Uma was married to veteran Hindi Film actor Prem Chopra. His brothers Rajendra Nath and Narendra Nath were also actors who mostly appeared in comic and supporting roles. He was also a close friend of the actress Asha Parekh. He died of a heart attack in 1992 at the age of 65, just 18 days before his 66th birthday.

Career

Premnath made his film debut in Ajit (1948), opposite Monica Desai, which was one of the first colour films. He got major roles in Raj Kapoor's first directorial film Aag (1948) and Barsaat (1949) which was his first major success. In 1951, Nath starred opposite Madhubala in [[Baadal (1951 film)|Badal]] which was a big box office success. In 1952, he co starred with Dilip Kumar in the swashbuckling technicolour film Aan  which was the highest grossing film at the time.

He went on to appear in many films in leading roles often opposite his wife Bina Rai which failed to do well. He set up a production company named P.N films and directed the film Samundar (1957), which was a box office disaster and remained his only directorial efffort. His career as a leading man declined in the late 1950s and early 1960s with the 1963 film Rustom Sohrab being one of his last films in the leading role.

He started receiving recognition with playing the central villain or supporting role in some of the biggest blockbusters in Indian film history throughout the 1970s.  Some of his notable films included Teesri Manzil (1966), Johny Mera Naam (1970), Tere Mere Sapne (1971), Shor (1972), Bobby (1973), Roti Kapda Aur Makaan (1974), Dharmatma (1975), Kalicharan (1976), Krodhi (1981) and Desh Premee (1982). He also starred in the religious Punjabi film Sat Sri Akal (1977). He earned Filmfare nominations as Best Supporting Actor for: Shor (1972), Bobby (1973), Amir Garib (1974) and Roti Kapda Aur Makaan (1974).

Apart from Hindi films, he also appeared in an episode of the American television series Maya in 1967 and a 1969 American film titled Kenner opposite former American football player turned actor Jim Brown. His last film appearance was in Hum Dono (1985) after which he retired from acting.

Filmography
Film

Directed filmsSamundar (1957), only film for P. N. Films, home production.

TV seriesMaya TV series (1 episode, 1967)

 Awards and nominations 

 Filmfare Awards 
Nominations

 1973 – Filmfare Award for Best Supporting Actor for Shor
 1974 – Filmfare Award for Best Supporting Actor for Bobby
1975 – Filmfare Award for Best Supporting Actor for Amir Garib 1975 – Filmfare Award for Best Supporting Actor for Roti Kapda Aur Makaan''

References

External links

Monty Nath on father Premnath

Article in The Sunday Tribune - Spectrum

1926 births
1992 deaths
Male actors in Hindi cinema
Indian male film actors
Hindkowan people
People from Peshawar
20th-century Indian male actors
Punjabi people
Filmfare Awards winners